EGMA Sinkhole, a.k.a. Peynirlikönü Sinkhole, is a sinkhole and the deepest cave in Turkey. It is located at Sugözü village of Anamur, Mersin. EGMA is an acronym that stands for Evren Günay - Mehmet Ali Özel.

The cave was discovered and first explored in 1993 by the Boğaziçi University Speleological Society (BÜMAK). A flash flood caused explorer Mehmet Ali Özel to lose his life inside the cave in 2001. In 2004, with the help of members of the Bulgarian Speleological Federation, the BÜMAK team recovered Mehmet Ali's body and also reached the deepest point of the cave.

See also 
 List of sinkholes of Turkey
 List of deepest caves

References

External links
The article and photos about the 2004 expedition in National Geographic Türkiye
BÜMAK Home Page
Bulgarian Speleological Federation Home Page

Caves of Turkey
Wild caves
Sinkholes of Turkey
Anamur District
Landforms of Mersin Province